Terminaline is a steroidal alkaloid isolated from Sarcococca.

References 

http://www.ebi.ac.uk/chebi/searchId.do?chebiId=CHEBI:9455

Alkaloids found in plants
Steroidal alkaloids